Dazzler (Alison Blaire) is a superheroine appearing in American comic books published by Marvel Comics, usually in association with the X-Men. She first appeared in Uncanny X-Men #130 (February 1980).

A mutant with the ability to convert sound vibrations into light and energy beams, Dazzler was developed as a cross-promotional, multi-media creation between Casablanca Records and Marvel Comics until the tie-ins were dropped in 1980. The character was created by a committee of Marvel staff, principally writer/editor Tom DeFalco and illustrator John Romita Jr.

Despite the fact that Dazzler was commissioned as a disco singer, the character shifted to other musical genres, including rock and adult contemporary. She starred in a self-titled series in the early 1980s which lasted forty-two issues, a Marvel Graphic Novel titled Dazzler: The Movie, a four-issue limited series co-starring The Beast titled Beauty and the Beast, and later joined the cast of the X-Men. She was briefly a member of the spin-off group Excalibur but has since re-joined the X-Men.

Dazzler has been described as one of Marvel's most notable and powerful female heroes, being labeled as an LGBT icon.

Dazzler made her live-action debut in Dark Phoenix played by Halston Sage.

Publication history

Origins of Dazzler

Dazzler was commissioned by Casablanca Records in 1978 as an animated special to be a multi-media cross-promotion with the character known as "The Disco Queen". Marvel Comics would develop a singing superhero, while Casablanca would produce a singer. Marvel Comics editor-in-chief Jim Shooter wrote a treatment for the animated special, which quickly turned into a live-action feature-length film project that would be produced by Filmworks. Shooter put together a small committee at Marvel to figure out the character's nature, background and personality. Writer Tom DeFalco was the lead writer behind her creation, while artist John Romita Jr. designed her. The character soon changed its name from The Disco Queen to Dazzler, thanks to a suggestion from writer Roger Stern. Due to financial concerns, Casablanca Records left the project, but the film was still in the works.

Romita, Jr. intended for the character to resemble model, actress, and singer Grace Jones, but representatives from Filmworks – wanting to promote model and actress Bo Derek – insisted on design changes to reflect Derek's features. The film project was ultimately canceled after Filmworks refused to let Bo Derek's husband, John Derek, direct the movie.

Dazzler: 1981-1985
Dazzler guest starred in Marvel titles, such as The Uncanny X-Men, The Amazing Spider-Man, and Fantastic Four before getting her own comic series. She also guest-starred in The Avengers, and the Marvel crossover, Contest of Champions.

John Romita, Jr. left Dazzler in issue #3, and was replaced by Frank Springer, who penciled most of the Dazzler series. DeFalco stayed on as chief writer through issue #6, and helped successive writer Danny Fingeroth with several of the following issues. Fingeroth and Springer remained the Dazzler stable team through issue #27.

With issue #25, Dazzler became a bi-monthly publication. Springer changed Dazzler from a singer in New York to an aspiring actress in Los Angeles. To promote this new direction, Marvel had artist Bill Sienkiewicz create painted artwork pieces for issues #27 through #35. Springer left Dazzler with issue #32, but returned briefly for issue #35 and the Dazzler: The Movie graphic novel.

Archie Goodwin and Paul Chadwick were assigned to Dazzler with issue #38, but the series was canceled in 1985. After that, she was considered as a possible X-Factor founding member, but the decision to resurrect Jean Grey put that idea aside.

X-Men
The character then went on to a notable run as an X-Men member, before disappearing for much of the 1990s and early 2000s, barring occasional cameos. With the launch of New Excalibur, she returned to monthly publication for the first time as a prominent cast member in over fifteen years. When Marvel canceled New Excalibur, Dazzler was brought back as a supporting character in Uncanny X-Men written by Matt Fraction. In February 2010, Marvel published a one-shot Dazzler special by writer Jim McCann and artist Kalman Andrasofszky. The 2012 series X-Treme X-Men features Dazzler as the leader of a dimension-hopping X-Men team. Dazzler appeared in the 2012 volume of The Uncanny X-Men as an agent of superspy outfit S.H.I.E.L.D.

A-Force
Beginning in May 2015, Dazzler appears as one of the main characters in A-Force, an all-female Avengers launched by G. Willow Wilson, Marguerite Bennett, and Jorge Molina during Marvel's "Secret Wars" storyline.

Fictional character biography

Alison Blaire was born in Gardendale, New York to Carter Blaire and Katherine Blaire. Her mutant powers first manifest when she is in junior high school. An aspiring singer, she volunteers to perform at her school dance when her light-generating abilities first appear. Everyone at the dance assumes it is a technologically generated special effect, an assumption commonly made before she reveals herself to be a mutant later in her life.

Using the stage name "Dazzler", Alison sets out to make a name for herself in the music industry, using her light powers and dancing ability to enhance her performances. It is at one of her shows that Alison first meets the X-Men while they are attacked by the forces of the Hellfire Club. Angry at the interruption of her show, Alison lashes out in anger at the Hellfire intruders, unintentionally making one member catatonic. Alison subsequently aids the X-Men in finding Kitty Pryde. She has always assumed that life as a disco queen would be exciting but finds the fight with the X-Men's enemies going a bit too far. Thus she turns down their offer to join the team.

Dazzler hides her status as a mutant from all but those closest to her. After acquainting herself with the various Marvel Comics superheroes, Alison finds herself continually using her abilities to fight both ordinary criminals and rogue superhumans—often at the expense of her career ambitions. On one occasion, she meets Spider-Man, teaming up against the Lightmaster. She later battles the Enchantress, is overwhelmed by Doctor Doom, the Absorbing Man and then fights off Nightmare. She briefly allies with the Blue Shield, and aids the X-Men and Spider-Woman against the misguided Caliban. On another occasion, she battles and defeats the Hulk, and establishes a long-standing feud with the then-mentally unstable Rogue. She also has a romantic affair with Warren Worthington III.
In the course of her inadvertent adventures, she even encounters the planet-devouring Galactus, who initially thinks she is of little notice and generally ignores her. Nevertheless, Galactus temporarily endows her with cosmic energy so she can retrieve the herald Terrax. In addition to being offered membership into the X-Men, Alison is also asked to audition for a place in the Avengers. She declines while facing Fabian Stankowicz (who is ultimately easily defeated by the Wasp), saying that the superhero "trip wasn't for [her]".

Dazzler moves to Los Angeles in a vain attempt to help her half-sister Lois London, who has the mutant power to kill anyone with a touch, but has little to no control over the ability. While in Los Angeles, Alison attempts careers in fitness training, dancing, modeling, and acting. Influenced both by her lover Roman Nekoboh, and her desire to abate the growing anti-mutant sentiment, Alison publicly declares her mutant identity. The revelation backfires, destroying her reputation and career and inflaming anti-mutant sentiment, which sends Alison into a depressive state. Forced again into hiding, she spends some time as a keyboard player and back-up vocalist in rock singer and fellow mutant Lila Cheney's band. While on tour, the band's plane crashes, which leads to Dazzler, Lila, and a bandmate being successfully rescued by Cannonball and Joshua. Lila has been knocked out so Dazzler uses the music Joshua plays at the scene to blast a hole through the wreckage. Alison is later possessed by the psychic mutant Malice; after an encounter with the X-Men coming to warn her about the Marauders, Dazzler is freed from possession and becomes a member of the team.

During her tenure with the X-Men, Dazzler receives training, attains greater control over her powers, and develops a romance with the extra-dimensional Longshot. She is also forced to work alongside the now-reformed Rogue. This causes considerable tension between them at first, due to Alison's difficulty in getting over Rogue's attempts to kill her in the past, as well as Rogue's own strong feelings for Longshot. Over time, Alison eventually believes Rogue is genuinely remorseful and forgives her teammate. Dazzler struggles with her career ambitions and personal insecurities, and eventually she and her teammates in the X-Men enter the mystical Siege Perilous. Discovered in an amnesiac state washed up on a beach by her former bodyguard Guido, she is nursed back to health by Guido and Lila, though their efforts prove unsuccessful in helping restore her memory. Her memory is eventually restored when she is found by Longshot. Devastated by the loss of her career, Alison ventures to Longshot's native "Mojoworld", and remains there to help fight in the ongoing rebellion against the tyrant Mojo along with Lila.

Dazzler eventually returns to Earth without Longshot after an unfortunate series of events, including an apparent miscarriage and war. She helps Jean Grey in the fight against a repowered Magneto backed by an army of Genoshans. She and Jean lead a small band of mutants to back up the original X-Men that are in Genosha already. Dazzler faces down Magneto, who turns her powers against her and apparently incinerates her. As Magneto arrogantly boasts about this triumph, Dazzler reveals herself to be alive and well. She and Jean had concocted a plan for Alison to generate a hard-light hologram of herself to distract Magneto, then gravely wounded by Wolverine. After the conclusion of this incident, the X-Men offer Alison support for her personal problems, but she declines.

Characters in the Marvel Universe who are counted among her fans are Juggernaut, teammate Colossus, the Hulk, Northstar, the Rhino, Molly Hayes, Kitty Pryde, Moon Knight, Captain Marvel, and Pixie.

New Excalibur

Dazzler later re-establishes her musical career, marketing her original, signature disco image as part of the Techno/Trance genre. Alison moves her career abroad to England and joins with X-Men allies such as the Juggernaut and Captain Britain. She is reunited with Longshot in the X-Men: Die by the Sword miniseries, although Longshot is suffering from amnesia and does not remember her. However, during the course of the miniseries he regains his feelings for her and some of his memories. Longshot leaves the Exiles to reestablish a relationship with Dazzler but the couple splits ways due in part to Dazzler's frustration with other women's attraction to Longshot, but mainly because of the realization that Longshot is no longer the man she loved because of his amnesia.

Return to the X-Men

Alison Blaire rejoins the X-Men in San Francisco after leaving Longshot, due to the fact that their relationship was just not the same after Longshot's loss of memory. Pixie is seen leaving a club with a friend where Alison has recently performed. Dazzler has established a career as a musician, finally landing a big break and completely revitalizing her music career. Dazzler has also been shown to take part in the X-Men: Secret Invasion mini-series, which is part of Marvel Comics' 2008 crossover Secret Invasion.  Returning home with Northstar and Pixie, after taking her out to get drunk, despite her being underage, Dazzler and the team are unprepared for a brutal attack on the mansion by the Sisterhood. In retaliation, Dazzler later accompanies Emma Frost, Storm and Karma for the revenge-attack on the Sisterhood in San Francisco where she engages a mind controlled Psylocke, in her own body, in battle. While Psylocke gains the upper hand, Dazzler points out that Storm blew out all the windows when they entered. This was so she could absorb all the sound from the city outside, which she turned into a beam of light that burns the right side of Psylocke's face off. After the Sisterhood retreats, Dazzler is happily reunited with Psylocke regaining control of her Japanese body.

X-Men: Second Coming
Dazzler, along with Gambit, Anole, Northstar, Cannonball, Pixie and Trance travel to Limbo to rescue Magik. Things go wrong when the ground starts to tremble and an army of monstrous demons attack the team. Dazzler calls upon Gambit for help during the attack, but Gambit sinks into the darkness, claiming "Remy's not home right now" leading the X-Men to be overwhelmed by the demons. Dazzler ends up alone and is rescued by Northstar just as she is about to lose her fight against the demons. Northstar and Dazzler encounter Gambit shortly after, unfortunately Gambit has reverted to the Death persona, seemingly attacking Northstar who easily evades Gambit's cards. Northstar avoids the attack, realizing the cards were meant for Dazzler and she is transformed into a state much like Gambit's Death persona. Northstar was infected soon after. Dazzler, infected by Gambit (now completely consumed by the concept of survival of the fittest), joins to infect the other X-Men in Limbo as well. Dazzler and Northstar were soon freed thanks to Magik's Soulsword.

Regenesis
During the Schism between Cyclops and Wolverine, Dazzler chooses to remain in San Francisco with Cyclops's side. Dazzler is then asked to lead a "Street Team" of X-Men, to which she agrees. Although never seen, she was paired with Boom Boom and Lifeguard.

X-Treme X-Men
Dazzler is later summoned to Utopia to help Cyclops and Danger with a Ghost Box. When the Ghost Box is opened, several alternate reality X-Men are seen fighting an evil version of Professor X. When Dazzler tries to help them, she gets sucked through a portal and is whisked away from Earth-616, narrowly avoiding the events of Avengers vs. X-Men. She becomes team leader after Emmeline Frost opts to stay on a world where mutants are gods. Dazzler was later reunited with her New Excalibur teammate Sage when she tries to rescue a kid version of Nightcrawler. Dazzler's leadership skills and abilities impress both Cyclops and Wolverine, the latter of whom offers her a position at Wolverine's school believing she would be an invaluable resource to the students. Reluctant to accept the invitation after having spent a year traversing and saving the multiverse (concluding with the "X-Termination" crossover storyline), as well as witnessing the death of some of her friends, Dazzler opts instead to make a decision at a later time; Wolverine advises the offer still stands and to contact when she figures things out.

X-Factor
In "The End of X-Factor" storyline, the conclusion of the X-Factor team with whom Dazzler had not previously had contact, Shatterstar and Rictor encounter a past-version of Dazzler while time-traveling through Mojoworld. At this point in her life, Dazzler and Longshot are still married and active in the revolt against Mojo. Rictor discovers Dazzler just as she is about to give birth to the child that had been believed to result in a miscarriage. The surviving infant was revealed to be Shatterstar, resolving nearly two decades of speculation that Shatterstar actually was the biological child of Dazzler and Longshot. Exhausted from her ordeal, Dazzler passes out, and Shatterstar reveals the necessity of wiping both her and Longshot's memories of the event, presumably to be replaced with memory of the miscarriage that Dazzler had referenced in the past, and taking his infant self a century into Mojoworld's future, to be raised as a warrior away from his birth parents.

Agent of S.H.I.E.L.D.
In an attempt to better understand the mutant community and Cyclops's talk of mutant revolution, Maria Hill personally asks Dazzler to become an agent of S.H.I.E.L.D., a proposition Alison accepts. After her first encounter with Cyclops's X-Men team, Dazzler is poisoned and replaced by the shapeshifter Mystique. Dazzler is rescued by Magneto and she was told how she was kidnapped and put in a coma-like state so that Mystique could use her to generate Mutant Growth Hormone; afterwards she joins Cyclops's Uncanny X-Men team with a new darker Goth appearance.

A-Force
During the Secret Wars storyline, A-Force, the defenders of the matriarchal Battleworld nation of Arcadia, responds to a megalodon attack while on routine patrol. During the attack, America Chavez throws the shark across the Shield, the wall that separates their borders, thus breaking the laws of Emperor Doom and is subsequently arrested by Doom's enforcers, the Thor Corps. Despite appeals from She-Hulk, the baroness of Arcadia, Chavez is sentenced to spend the rest of her life on the wall. In response, She-Hulk tasks the Sub-Mariners - Namor, Namorita, and Namora - to find the source of the megalodon attack. Meanwhile, Nico, lamenting the loss of Chavez, comes across a mysterious figure that fell out of the sky. The Sub-Mariners discover a strange portal in the ocean's depths but it implodes as they draw near. Later, at the behest of Loki, Minoru introduces her new friend to She-Hulk. When Medusa accuses the stranger, a sentient pocket universe, of creating the portal, a sentinel falls from another portal and attacks the team. During the fight, the newcomer saves Dazzler and convinces She-Hulk that she is not the cause. After destroying the sentinel, She-Hulk decides to travel through the still open portal and investigate the source herself. She-Hulk arrives in a post-apocalyptic Manhattan and after a brief encounter with more sentinels, she is chased back to Arcadia by the Thor Corps. The Thor Corps follow in pursuit, but Medusa manages to repel them back into the portal and is killed in the process. When the Thor Corps return, She-Hulk alerts the citizens of Arcadia that there is a traitor in their midst that is spreading discontent and vows to bring them to justice as she and other A-Forcers go into hiding inside the newcomer. The newcomer smuggles A-Force outside the city. There, She-Hulk realizes that the portals' energy is of Asgardian origin and they deduce that the traitor is Loki. With A-Force outlawed, Loki is set to be crowned the new baroness of Arcadia but is preemptively attacked by A-Force. After Loki is defeated, she releases a final blast of energy that breaches the Shield thus allowing the zombie horde on the other side to enter. As the horde approaches, She-Hulk rallies A-Force, the Thor Corps and other heroes in defense of Arcadia. During the fight, the zombies begin to overwhelm the city but the newcomer – now named Singularity – absorbs the entire horde, sacrificing herself in the process. In the aftermath of the battle, the Thor Corps arrests Loki as A-Force begins reconstruction of Arcadia. Meanwhile, She-Hulk comforts Minoru, who is still mourning the loss of her friends, telling her that she believes Singularity lives on.

After the Secret Wars storyline, while participating in a roller derby in Miami, Dazzler is approached by Singularity, She-Hulk, Captain Marvel, Nico Minoru and Medusa to help them defeat Antimatter, since they required a powerful light source to defeat their foe. When Antimatter appeared it became apparent that even with Dazzler's help they couldn't defeat him so Singularity teleported everyone to Alpha Flight Low-Orbit Space Station where Dr. Tempest Bell theorized that killing Antimatter would also kill Singularity due to their connection via a quantum entanglement. A-Force attempted to negotiate with Antimatter but he explained he sought to understand humanity by disassembling their molecules and finding a use for them. This led to a fight in which Dazzler was critically injured and died on the operating table. Dazzler woke up following the failed operation to realize it seemed like she was unable to die. Dazzler rejoined the fight against Antimatter in time to take Singularity into a pocket dimension to protect her from dying when Antimatter was destroyed. Singularity sensed something else had broken through into their universe and as they set off Nico gave herself and Dazzler a magic makeover. Teleporting to Astoria, Oregon they found the dimension-hoppers were Dazzler Thor - an alternate version of Dazzler from Battleworld - and her opponent, a gigantic dragon who is actually a reality warping woman called Countess. The Countess vanished following her defeat and A-Force took Dazzler Thor to get "ale" and Nico convinces Dazzler to talk to Dazzler Thor. Dazzler revealed to her alternate self that she had accidentally come into contact with Terrigen Mist and contracted M-Pox which sterilizes and kills mutants. Dazzler Thor was the first person she told and even then Dazzler didn't know what it meant since it seemed her powers now included being unable to die. Dazzler woke up alongside the rest of A-Force and Dazzler Thor in a jail cell without any powers. Nico appeared under the mind control of the Countess who'd changed into the form of a woman and commanded Nico to strip A-Force of their powers. Dazzler Thor tries to call her hammer - Light Bringer - but Nico makes her unworthy with a spell. Without her god-like powers, Dazzler Thor also began falling victim to M-Pox. When A-Force annoyed the Countess, Nico was made to send She-Hulk into a murderous rage, but they used this to break the wall and escape. After surviving a spell Nico was forced to make that was meant to drown them, A-Force attacked the Countess during which Dazzler created a hologram of Nico so Medusa could sneak her away from the Countess' influence. Dazzler Thor used a hologram to get close to the Countess. But the Countess attacked and injured her, but Dazzler picked up Light Bringer to defend her. Once the fight was over, Dazzler Thor succumbed to the M-Pox virus and died in a flash of light. Dazzler revealed to the rest of A-Force she also had the lethal disease and left behind Light Bringer in respect for her fallen alternate self.

During the Civil War II storyline, Dazzler went with Captain Marvel to fight Thanos, who the Inhuman Ulysses had predicted would appear. Although Thanos was defeated, She-Hulk was seriously injured. Shortly afterwards, Ulysses predicted that Nico would murder an innocent woman named Alice. Captain Marvel wanted to arrest Nico before this could happen. Dazzler disagreed with Captain Marvel, saying that although she agreed with Tony Stark's view that they shouldn't arresting people for crimes that they might commit she only stood by Carol because she was her friend. When Nico arrives Captain Marvel tries to explain about the vision before Dazzler warns Nico that she's going to get arrested. Nico escapes and Captain Marvel blames Dazzler, who tells her if they could really predict they future they should have known it would happen. Dazzler and Singularity opposed Captain Marvel and Medusa's decision to hunt down and capture Nico. Dazzler and Singularity follow Marvel and Medusa to Arizona, Colorado where Nico is hiding with Elsa Bloodstone and find it overrun by an infection turning people into a swarm of giant bugs. After a brief confrontation when the rest of A-Force find Nico they split into two teams: one to find Alice and the other to protect the civilians. Dazzler, Singularity and Medusa protect civilians despite their disagreement. While searching for Alice in an abandoned mine, Danvers, Minoru and Bloodstone are attacked by a giant bug. The bug incapacitates Danvers and Bloodstone before telepathically communicating to Minoru that she is Alice and has been inadvertently infecting the townspeople after her transformation. Alice tells Minoru that killing her is the only way to save the people. When Minoru refuses, an infected Bloodstone threatens to kill Danvers. Medusa, Singularity, and an infected Dazzler are overrun by bugs and regroup with the others just as Bloodstone infects Danvers. After Dazzler infects Medusa, Minoru casts a spell to transform Alice back into a human but it does not cure the rest of the populace. Alice explains that she must be killed and Minoru reluctantly casts a death spell on Alice which transforms the infected back into humans. Alice then remerges in her final form and tells A-Force that she is no longer a threat as she now has greater control of her powers.

Inhumans vs X-Men 
During the Inhumans vs X-Men storyline, Dazzler assisted Emma Frost in the beginning of her plot to defeat the Inhumans. She disguised herself as an Inhuman performer shortly before ambushing Black Bolt in his own Quiet Room.

Dawn of X 
Dazzler is seen as one of the many mutants who have taken up residence on the newly established island nation of Krakoa.

Powers and abilities
Dazzler is a mutant with the ability to transduce sonic vibrations which reach her body into various types of light. This ability seems to operate over a great range of frequencies, including the audible spectrum, and a great variation of sound pressure levels regardless of the complexity, dissonance, or randomness of the sound. Sounds as different as a car crash and a symphonic passage both produce convertible incoming acoustic vibrations.

Dazzler prefers utilizing the sound of music, particularly that which is rhythmically sustained. Not only is music more pleasant to her ears, but the steady beat of contemporary music provides a more constant source of sound to convert. The precise means by which this conversion process works is as yet unknown. Dazzler has been shown to create a "null space" of sound in a certain radius of her person, as a result of "pulling" the sound in her area to her person, to either protect a crowd of people or to supercharge her power reserves.

Left undirected, Dazzler's light will radiate from her body in all directions, producing regular flashes of white light. By conscious control over the light she produces, she can control its direction, frequency (color), amplitude (intensity), and duration.

Dazzler's mutant ability can produce numerous other effects. She can create simple patterns out of rays of light or combinations of patterns which produce trance-like effects in her targets. She can create a pulse of light on the order of several thousand watts of power, which temporarily blinds people with its brilliance. She can create a chaotic cascade of sparkling lights and colors that severely upsets other people's equilibrium, or a pulsating strobe-light effect. She can also radiate light in gentle, soothing patterns to calm a person's mood. Dazzler can generate a coherent beam of light, approximating a laser beam. Dazzler can generate a shield from laser energy that can deflect projectiles or energy beams.

Dazzler has polarizing eyes and cannot be blinded or dazzled by light.

With effort, she can create holograms of human beings and other three-dimensional beings and objects. With similar effort she can also turn herself temporarily invisible and inaudible. She can also use light energy to generate some form of propulsion for flight or at least rapid ascent.

She generally directs lasers from a single finger when she requires precision. She most often uses her hands for directing her light effects, but she could also use other parts of her body. Since studying with the X-Men, she has become adept at directing her blinding strobe light blast from her eyes.

The most powerful manifestation of her laser abilities is a concentrated stream of solid photons she usually fires from her index finger but can emit from her entire body. The beam is extremely powerful and as a consequence uses a great deal of her energy reserves. She has also demonstrated the ability to stretch the electromagnetic spectrum to produce devastating microwave energy. She has since learned how to produce these blasts without draining herself, while still providing them with considerable power.

When Galactus enlisted her to retrieve his wayward herald Terrax from the heart of a black hole he had her exposed to unimaginable sounds, including the explosion of an entire galaxy, to boost her to sufficient levels.

Since the events of Dazzler: The Movie, Alison's body can store sound energy for future discharge as light. Thanks to Professor X, Dazzler's costume contains devices that enable her to store sonic energy more efficiently and to gauge and focus the light she generates with greater skill. She has also demonstrated on at least one occasion the ability to expel the stored sound into a devastating wave of sonic energy that destroyed her foe Silence.

Dazzler is immune to the injurious effects of her light transducing abilities. Her ability to transduce sound also protects her from being deafened by loud sounds; In Dazzler vol. 2 #1, it was indicated that her ears are highly developed allowing her to detect sounds on frequencies that others cannot register. In X-Treme X-Men vol. 2 #4, she demonstrates the ability to use sound waves for echolocation before absorbing them for energy. Dazzler has also been shown to be immune to the powers of her half-sister Mortis, which ordinarily kills living subjects instantly.

With considerable strain, Dazzler is capable of generating ultraviolet light in omnidirectional waves of such intensity that it will melt large metal structures.

Dazzler is a highly skilled athlete and hand-to-hand combatant thanks to her training with the X-Men and Gladiators, able to defeat over a dozen human combatants at once while purposely avoiding use of her mutant abilities. In addition, she is a talented singer, actress, and dancer. Dazzler is also a highly accomplished roller skater and can move at high speed; she is skilled enough to use her roller skates as weapons to strike an opponent's solar plexus in a flying kick. Dazzler occasionally wears a pair of roller skates which magnetically adhere to her boots.

Cultural impact and legacy

Critical reception 
Jerry Stanford of CBR.com referred to Dazzler as a "compelling hero," writing, "Dazzler has a fan following strong enough to keep a strong demand for her in the X-Menfamily of titles. Although her creation is mired in a failed cross-media event with a record company, her legacy in comics is achieving greatness despite her crass origins. Although much of her early adventures are trite, she went on to fame as one of the X-Men." Mike Avila of Syfy described Dazzler as "one of Marvel’s most unique and even notorious characters," writing, "After Dazzler headlined her own comic book series, Claremont further developed her as a member of the X-Men. She’s no longer quite as prevalent as she used to be, but Dazzler still has a devoted fan following 40 years after her debut." Chris Condry of Looper found Dazzler to be "worthy of more film time and fandom," asserting, "If Alison Blaire, aka Dazzler, were a real person, we daresay that she would be the most iconic woman on Earth. Blaire's day job, or more accurately night job, is as a world-famous pop star. Using her mutant powers which allow her to transduce sound into light and heat, Blaire proves her mutant name true by dazzling audiences with uniquely extravagant laser shows. She's both singer and special effects artist. In between gigs, Blaire operates as a superhero, working at various times as a member of the X-Men, a member of Excalibur, and agent of S.H.I.E.L.D. Essentially, Dazzler is what would happen if Lady Gaga spent her free time as John Wick." Bradley Prom of Screen Rant called Dazzler one of the characters who would be "perfect for their own animated series," saying, "An alternative character that would incorporate music in an impactful way is Dazzler. Her powers literally allow her to transform sound and music into powerful blasts of light and energy, which could make for some very interesting animation. As a mutant, she is part of the X-Men and her introduction is contingent on theirs. When they do finally make their way into the MCU, hopefully then Dazzler can take center stage."

Alex Welch of Inverse wrote, "A fan-favorite comics character, Dazzler is a professional singer with the power to manipulate sound into light. She’s capable of creating light shows, holograms, blinding people, and can even shoot bursts of light out of her body. She’s basically what it would look like if a pop star was an actual superhero." George Marston of Newsarama stated, "Dazzler is the gimmickiest, campiest, most ridiculous concept Marvel has ever let come to fruition - if you only judge her by her Abba-meets-roller-disco '70s costume. Though her proposed movie and album tie-ins never came to fruition, Dazzler herself went on to join the X-Men, becoming a cult classic fan-favorite mutant along the way. And why not? The fact is, Dazzler kicks ass. Her ability to turn sound into light has been expanded in creative and crafty ways time and time again, and her look has evolved from disco queen to aerobic video model, to an angst-inspired, darker look, and finally to her current style that combines elements of her previous looks with a modern twist. Still, Dazzler has somehow captured our hearts and fought tooth and nail to earn our respect, even earning a slot on the one-time all-female Avengers spin-off A-Force(opens in new tab)." Marc Buxton| of Den of Geek asserted, "Alison Blaire may have started out as somewhat of a joke, a way for Marvel to take advantage of the disco craze of the 70s, but she hasn’t remained that way. Instead, Dazzler has become one of the most beloved X-Men characters ever. She has the power to turn sound into music and is now the SHIELD mutant liaison. She remains one of the few mutants to ever have a solo comic title and not be given a film role." In November 2005, during an interview with Newsarama, writer Brian K. Vaughan asserted, "Ultimate Dazzler, on the other hand, may very well be Bendis’ single greatest contribution to the free world, so I use her way too much."

Accolades 

 In 2011, Comics Buyer's Guide ranked Dazzler 83rd in their "100 Sexiest Women in Comics" list.
 In 2012, ComicsAlliance ranked Dazzler 38th in their "50 Comics and Characters That Resonate with LGBT Readers" list.
 In 2015, Entertainment Weekly ranked Dazzler 52nd in their "Let's rank every X-Man ever" list.
 In 2015, BuzzFeed ranked Dazzler 22nd in their "95 X-Men Members Ranked From Worst To Best" list.
 In 2016, GameSpot included Dazzler in their "25 Most Criminally Underrated X-Men" list.
 In 2017, Screen Rant ranked Dazzler 14th in their "Marvel: 17 Most Powerful Agents Of SHIELD" list.
 In 2018, CBR.com ranked Dazzler 4th in their "20 Mutants That Look More Powerful Than They Really Are" list, 14th in their "Marvel's 15 Fiercest Female Mutants" list, and 15th in their "20 Most Powerful Mutants From The '80s" list.
 In 2019, CBR.com ranked Dazzler 8th in "10 Most Powerful Members Of Excalibur" list and 8th in their "10 Superheroes Who Became Celebrities On Their World" list.
 In 2020, Scary Mommy included Dazzler in their "Looking For A Role Model? These 195+ Marvel Female Characters Are Truly Heroic" list.
 In 2021, Screen Rant included Dazzler in their "10 Most Powerful Members Of Marvel's A-Force" list.
 In 2022, CBR.com ranked Dazzler 1st in their "10 Best Comic Book Musicians" list and 11th in their "X-Men: 15 Alpha-Level Mutants Who Are Deceptively Powerful" list.

Impact 
Ira Madison III of MTV described Dazzler as a "gay icon in the annals of Marvel legends," asserting, "Dazzler remains a hugely popular character, particularly among queer Marvel fans. [...] Even though her stories were never tied to the disco scene at large, her journey of struggling for acceptance from a dismissive father and longing for the love of her missing mother was something that queer readers, who only years earlier could have been arrested for showing signs of affection toward a member of the same sex in public, connected with. Embracing your sexuality had to happen in dark, sweaty nightclubs with disco music blaring, or, for younger gay men far from the metropolises of New York and San Francisco, it could occur in their childhood bedrooms, reading Dazzler's exploits in between more butch fare like X-Men and Spider-Man that wouldn't get them bullied." Jerry Stanford of CBR.com asserted, "Almost since the beginning, the story of mutants in the Marvel Universe has been an allegory for the civil rights of marginalized groups. Initially, it was the civil rights movement for African Americans, but in recent years, it has taken on aspects of the fight for LGBTQ rights. In Dazzler: X-Song, this became very apparent. The friction between mutants, still recovering from Scarlet Witch's decimation of their numbers, and Inhumans, whose numbers expanded into the general population is on full display here. Dazzler strives for unity and her words mirror things said in the LGBTQ community. Different groups sometimes seek to alienate others as not worthy of inclusion, and the fight here makes a stand for a big tent movement." Andrew Wheeler of ComicsAlliance stated, "Ideas of self-ownership occur again and again in Claremont's stories and characters. Emma Frost is a woman who truly owns her sexuality. The villain Mystique has a fluid identity that in no way compromises her certainty of self. And Dazzler is mutantdom's first drag performer, using stage theatrics to present her true self to the world. On the stage she could embrace her mutant identity in a way that wouldn't feel safe on the street."

Brian Andersen of The Advocate said, "Dazzler isn’t queer. But being the premier superhero pop singer in the Marvel Universe means a strong argument can be made that she’s a gay icon. Dazzler debuted in 1980 as a roller-skating, catsuit-wearing rocker. She would be a fabulous addition to an X-movie set in the ’80s – the era in which X-Men: Apocalypse will reportedly take place. Ditch the skates and the disco influence and reintroduce Dazzler as a Madonna/Cyndi Lauper kind of rubber band bracelet–wearing, teased hair–sporting, fashion-trendsetting pop songstress, and you’ve got one fabulous addition to the team." Hayden Manders of Nylon wrote, "All socio-political commentary aside, superhero narratives are filled with strong female characters, which we know makes up a huge percentage of queer icons. Characters like Wonder Woman, Storm, Dazzler, Captain Marvel, and Buffy the Vampire Slayer are fierce and independent, capable of kicking just as much (if not more!) ass as their male counterparts. [...] That sort of representation is vital to the queer experience; it helps normalize what the world often sees as abnormal. Their superpowers only add another element of fearlessness to the community, because to be queer is to have superpowers."

Literary reception

Volumes

Dazzler - 1981 
According to Marvel Comics, Dazzler #1 sold more than 400 000 copies.

Angelo Delos Trinos of CBR.com ranked the Dazzler comic book series 5th in their "10 Times Comics Changed The World" list, writing, "The '80s were some of comics' most profitable years, and this was thanks in part to the growing speculator market. Publishers were already moving away from young readers to adults who treated comics more as an investment than populist entertainment. They finalized this shift after Dazzler #1 , by Tom Defalco, John Romita Senior and Junior, John Buscema, Alfredo Alcala, Bob McCleod, and Glynis Wein became a blockbuster. In 1981, Marvel tested the collectors' market by selling Dazzler #1 exclusively in comic shops. The experiment was a success, and Dazzler #1 quickly sold upwards of 400,000 copies. From this point onwards, many comics were only sold in comic shops and the speculator market became comics' dominant sales demographic, until the bubble burst in 1996."

Dazzler - 2010 
According to Diamond Comic Distributors, Dazzler #1 was the 115th best selling comic book in May 2010.

Doug Zawisza of CBR.com called Dazzler #1 a ""Greatest Hits" comic album of Dazzler's best material," stating, "The true story here is Dazzler figuring out what she wants, and what she needs to do for herself. I'm not completely sold on the need for a Dazzler series, nor do I think this story is strong enough to warrant anything further than a backup tale or additional one-shot, but given the potential for a character like Dazzler -- she's a widely known mutant who has had a successful entertainment-based career and needs to stage a comeback -- I can see Marvel granting this character more story time." Bryan Joel of IGN gave Dazzler #1 a grade of 7.3 out of 10, saying, "Those original issues of Dazzler are full of off-the-wall lunacy, to be sure (at the end of the day, it's about a disco artist regularly dragged into the world of superheroics against her will -- what else can you expect?), but at the heart is a solid character who proved she could stand on her own well before she ever officially joined the ranks of her fellow mutants in Uncanny X-Men, making her a great candidate to show off the themes central to the "Women of Marvel" drive."

Dazzler: X-Song - 2018 
According to Diamond Comic Distributor, Dazzler: X-Song #1 was the 100th best selling comic book in June 2018.

Mike Fugere of CBR.com referred to Dazzler: X-Song #1 as "the most important X-story Marvel has published in years," writing, "X-Song might go down in comic book history as just another footnote in the massive tome that is the X-Men comic canon, but that doesn’t make its message any less meaningful or important. This is a comic of the times, and hopefully, in decades to come, young readers first discovering the X-Men will stumble upon Visaggio and Braga's story, only to find the negative notions harbored by the less than desirable Inhuman characters as passé. Maybe Dazzler isn’t the beckon of social progress we were looking for, but it seems she has become the one we have." Joshua Davison of Bleeding Cool stated, "Dazzler: X-Song is a looser and more free-flowing narrative than many superhero comics. This is contrasted by the serious nature of its themes, making for an interesting and almost modernist comic. It's about downtrodden people on the fringes of society just trying to have some joy in their lives while, even there, people try to take it away. It's smartly-written too, acknowledging the subtle aspects of racism and how it can manifest. The loose and jumping plot conveys the feeling of people just trying to get by. [...] Dazzler: X-Song #1 is an excellent self-contained story centering around the ever-lovable Allison Blaire of the X-Men. The themes are interesting, the characters that are supposed to be likable succeed in being so, and the art looks great. This one earns a recommendation. Give it a read."

Other versions

Age of Apocalypse

Dazzler appears as a member of the X-Men. She is a chain smoker, having no use for a singing voice in this timeline. She is also more skilled with her powers, being able to create hard-light constructs, as well as manipulate both light and sound energies. With this new power-set, Dazzler serves as a one-woman training facility, as well as a messenger via holographic transmissions.  She was romantically involved with Exodus, and did not accompany the main team of X-Men in the final assault on Apocalypse.

Dazzler was one of the characters involved in the original Age of Apocalypse to be brought back for the Age of Apocalypse 10th Anniversary miniseries. Like many of the other X-Men, Dazzler's costume in the 10th anniversary reflects an updated take on her original costume: the silver jumpsuit. Against the battle with Mr. Sinister's Sinister Six, Dazzler was swallowed within Cloak's dark dimension, but is ultimately saved by a lightning bolt from Storm which forces Cloak to spit her back out.

The End
In X-Men: The End, a series about the X-Men's hypothetical future, Dazzler reverted her costume to reflect her classic, silver design, continuing her career as a singer. Dazzler, an occasional "reserve" team member, joined Storm and X-Men members Iceman, Bishop, Psylocke, and Sage for Xavier's "Plan B" team. Co-piloting the ship to the extraterrestrial Shi'ar homeworld, Dazzler uses her powers to create a light show, calming the passions of the battling X-Men and Shi'ar Imperial Guard. The series' primary villain—Cassandra Nova—then manifests, slaying the Imperial Guard and leaving the remaining X-Men as her sole adversaries. Dazzler attempts to subdue Cassandra along with Storm and Iceman. While she uses her ability to laser a hole through Cassandra's head, Storm strikes her with lightning, giving Iceman a chance to freeze her. Bishop then shatters her to prevent her from returning. However, Cassandra simply reforms and, as a form of retaliation, blasts a hole through Dazzler, strikes Storm with energy, and freezes Iceman. She successfully killed Storm and Dazzler, but Iceman survived the ordeal. Dazzler is believed to be among the slain X-Men that were invited to a plane of higher existence by the Phoenix.

House of M
When Wanda Maximoff, the Scarlet Witch, used her reality-altering powers to change the world, Dazzler became one of the most famous mutants on Earth. After having a successful singing career as a teenager, Dazzler continued her career as the world's primary media personality via her syndicated talk show.

The House of M newsprint special featured a tabloid-esque blind article, indicating that Alison's signature lightshow was fading due to a rare blood disorder, which was causing her to lose her mutation. Storm used Alison's popular talk show to sound off on her disapproval of Magneto's handling of mutant affairs and Mister Sinister was seen watching the Alison show when Deadpool went to rescue an infant Cable.

Author Brian Michael Bendis scripted for this version of Dazzler to be this altered reality's answer to Oprah.

Marvel Zombies
Dazzler appears as one of the few uninfected heroes in the limited series Marvel Zombies vs. The Army of Darkness. There, she is almost eaten by an infected Winter Soldier until he is killed by Ash Williams. Ash is attracted to Dazzler, but she does not reciprocate his feelings. As a thanks for saving her, Dazzler agrees to help Ash find the Necronomicon book that might put an end to the zombies. The duo pair up with the Scarlet Witch to discover that the Necronomicon is being kept at Doctor Doom's fortress in Latveria. Ash discovers the Necronomicon, but the sentient book reveals to Ash that it had nothing to do with this world's infection, which was of extraterrestrial and not supernatural origin. On his way back, he meets an imprisoned Enchantress. Because of the unusual nature of her powers, Ash believes the Enchantress is uninfected and frees her. In a confrontation with Dazzler, the Enchantress bites off her finger, infecting her, but Doom appears and vaporizes the two before Dazzler is turned.

Ultimate Marvel
The Ultimate Marvel incarnation of Dazzler is introduced as a punk rock singer in Ultimate X-Men #42. She briefly joins Emma Frost's Academy of Tomorrow when promised a record deal, but joins the X-Men after they rescue her from a Sentinel attack. There she is called "Dazzler" after the name of her band.

She often shows a lack of enthusiasm for the X-Men and their endeavors, but after learning of a proposed public execution of a mutant, she convinces a group of teammates to go on a rescue mission. When the mission goes astray and Angel is captured, Dazzler takes initiative and leads the team in a recovery operation. This leads to the accidental release of Longshot.

Later, she and Angel go out on a presumed 'date' (really an effort to get themselves involved with the X-Men's latest mission) preventing the Academy of Tomorrow students from attacking the Triskelion. During the incident, power is lost and one of the inmates, Deathstrike, impales Dazzler through the chest. Ironically, Deathstrike is defeated by the very killer Dazzler has assisted before.

Dazzler stays in a coma for several weeks, visited many times by Nightcrawler having an unrequited crush on her. Unfortunately, many factors have combined to unhinge Nightcrawler and as soon as she is able to be moved, she is fooled into thinking they must escape. Initially trusting Nightcrawler, she cooperates until the rest of the X-Men rescue her. The others, understanding Nightcrawler is mentally ill, plan to rehabilitate. Dazzler does not accept this and quits the team in protest.

She has since been labeled as one of the "most important" mutants to the X-Men's cause by the future Bishop. Dazzler later joins Bishop's new team in Ultimate X-Men #82. When Bishop dies in Ultimate X-Men #90, Dazzler returned to the Xavier Institute to be with Angel and on Xavier's X-Men team once again. She is seen to be on Colossus's enhanced team, using the drug Banshee to boost her powers. The drug enhanced team battles Xavier's main X-Men and eventually leave their drug-filled lives and return to the X-Mansion.

When Magneto's worldwide devastation hits the X-Men, Dazzler is revealed by Jean Grey to have been killed along with teammates Beast and Nightcrawler.

The Ultimate iteration of Dazzler does not convert sound into light in this continuity. Her powers are defined as "Matter Detonation"; by detonating small particles in the air, she is able to create brilliant photokinetic effects, controlling the color and intensity of the light created. Under the influence of the drug Banshee, Dazzler's powers are vastly increased, and she is able to create solid light constructs such as a sword, a tiger for her to ride into battle, and even a copy of Wolverine's claws, which she uses to fight Wolverine. Dazzler's true powers are shown when she detonates the matter making up Sentinel robots, completely destroying them with her sheer power.

Some while later, May Parker's house is being sold by a realtor named Alison Blaire.

Interlocking Technologies
A woman from Earth-721 was given the powers and appearance of Dazzler by Interlocking Technologies. She came to Earth-616 and impersonated the original Alison. She toured the Western States of the US in Dazzler's original costume. However, she was ultimately discovered, stripped of her powers and returned to Earth-721.

X-Babies
A member of the X-Babies is based on Dazzler.

Earth X
In the Earth X timeline, Dazzler had her heart torn out by Mephisto though due to the "death" of Death, she lives on in constant agony.

What If?
In What If #33 (June 1982), Dazzler decides to stay Galactus’ herald after she defeats Terrax. After many years of servitude, during which she guides Galactus to feed on uninhabited worlds to spare the lives of beings on other planets, she is free to return to Earth. When she arrives, Dazzler discovers the Earth had become a barren wasteland and, with nowhere else to go, she returns to Galactus who welcomes her return.

In a two-part What If? story (What if Cable had destroyed the X-Men? and What if Magneto took over the U.S.?) based on Uncanny X-Men #269, Dazzler is an agent of Magneto.  She is ultimately killed by a Sentinel warhead.

President Blaire
In X-Men: Battle Of The Atom, Dazzler becomes the first mutant President of the United States in the future. However, during her Inauguration speech, she is assassinated by fire from flying demons along with Jamie Madrox, and several audience members.

Dazzler Thor
A version of Dazzler appeared during the 2015 "Secret Wars" storyline as part of the Thor Corps, a paramilitary organization charged with policing Battleworld and enforcing the will of God Emperor Doom. Dazzler Thor later appears in the mainstream Earth-616 universe, after coming through a multi-dimensional portal and joins A-Force in their fight against the Countess, a dragon who came through the same portal. After Countess is defeated, Dazzler Thor succumbs to the effects that this universe's Terrigen Mists had on her system and vanishes.

In other media

Television
 Dazzler appears in X-Men: Pryde of the X-Men, voiced by Alexandra Stoddart. This version is a member of the X-Men.
 Dazzler appears in X-Men: The Animated Series, voiced by Catherine Disher.
 Dazzler makes minor appearances in Wolverine and the X-Men. This version is an inhabitant of Genosha. Additionally, a possible future version appears in a flashback in the episode "Badlands" as one of several Genoshans killed by the Phoenix Force.
 Hulu intended to air a Tigra & Dazzler animated series, written and executive produced by Erica Rivinoja and Chelsea Handler. Following their series, the pair would have teamed up with MODOK, Hit-Monkey and Howard the Duck in the animated special The Offenders. In December 2019, Rivinoja and the entire writing staff was fired due to creative differences. Handler was still attached to the project. In January 2020, it was announced that Tigra & Dazzler, along with the Howard the Duck series were canceled, making The Offenders unlikely.

Film
 In the early 1980s, screenwriter Gary Goddard was commissioned to write a script for a film based on Dazzler, starring Bo Derek. The project was ultimately abandoned when temperamental director John Derek was brought on board, leading investors to back out.
 Alison Blaire / Dazzler makes a cameo appearance in Dark Phoenix, portrayed by Halston Sage. This version is a student of Xavier's School for Gifted Youngsters from the 1980s.

Video games
 Dazzler appears as a playable character in X-Men.
 Dazzler appears as a playable character in X-Men: Madness in Murderworld.
 Dazzler appears as a playable character in X-Men II: The Fall of the Mutants.
 Dazzler appears as a NPC in the PC version of X-Men Legends II: Rise of Apocalypse.
 Dazzler makes a cameo appearance in Felicia's ending in Marvel vs. Capcom 3: Fate of Two Worlds.
 Dazzler appears in Stern Pinball: Deadpool, voiced by Jennifer Lafleur.
 Dazzler appears as a playable character in Marvel Puzzle Quest.
 Dazzler appears as a playable character in Marvel Future Fight.
 Dazzler appears in the digital collectible card game Marvel Snap.

Collected editions

Further reading
 The Spectacular Sisterhood of Superwomen: Awesome Female Characters from Comic Book History by Hope Nicholson, Quirk Books (2017)

References

External links
 
 "Dissecting the Dazzler", Interview with DeFalco, Simonsen, and Stern
 Dazzler Series Synopsis, William George Ferguson
 UncannyXmen.net Spotlight on Dazzler
 The Debut of the Dazzler
 

1981 comics debuts
Characters created by John Romita Jr.
Characters created by Louise Simonson
Characters created by Roger Stern
Characters created by Tom DeFalco
Comics about women
Comics characters introduced in 1980
Excalibur (comics)
Fictional actors
Fictional characters from New York (state)
Fictional characters who can manipulate light
Fictional characters who can manipulate sound
Fictional dancers
Fictional singers
Fictional models
Fictional musicians
Marvel Comics female superheroes
Marvel Comics film characters
Marvel Comics martial artists
Marvel Comics mutants
Marvel Comics titles
X-Men members